The geography of Texas is diverse and large. Occupying about 7% of the total water and land area of the U.S., it is the second largest state after Alaska, and is the southernmost part of the Great Plains, which end in the south against the folded Sierra Madre Oriental of Mexico. Texas is in the South Central United States of America, and is considered to form part of the U.S. South and also part of the U.S. Southwest.

By residents, the state is generally divided into North Texas, East Texas, Central Texas, South Texas, West Texas and, sometimes, the Panhandle, but according to the Texas Almanac, Texas has four major physical regions: Gulf Coastal Plains, Interior Lowlands, Great Plains, and Basin and Range Province. This has been cited as the difference between human geography and physical geography, although the fact that Texas was granted the prerogative to divide into as many as five U.S. states may be a historical motive for Texans defining their state as containing exactly five regions.

Some regions in Texas are more associated with the American Southeast (primarily East Texas, Central Texas, and North Texas), while the Panhandle is considered by many to have more in common with parts of the plains Midwest than either the South or Southwest. Geographically and culturally, El Paso is closer to New Mexico or Arizona than it is to Austin or to East Texas. The size of Texas prohibits easy categorization of the entire state wholly in any recognized region of the United States, and even cultural diversity among regions of the state makes it difficult to treat Texas as a region in its own right.

Physical geography
The longest straight-line distance is from the northwest corner of the panhandle to the Rio Grande river just below Brownsville, . The largest continental state is so expansive that El Paso, in the western corner of the state, is closer to San Diego, California, than to the Houston/Beaumont area, near the Louisiana state line; while Orange, on the border with Louisiana, is closer to Jacksonville, Florida, than it is to El Paso. Texarkana, in the northeastern corner of the state, is about the same distance from Chicago, Illinois, as it is from El Paso, and Dalhart, in the northwestern corner of the state, is closer to the state capitals of Kansas, Nebraska, Colorado, New Mexico, Oklahoma and Wyoming than it is to Austin, its own state capital.

There are 3,700 named streams and 15 major river systems flowing through  of Texas, supporting over 212 reservoirs.

With 10 climatic regions, 14 soil regions, and 11 distinct ecological regions, regional classification becomes problematic with differences in soils, topography, geology, rainfall, and plant and animal communities.

Coast and estuaries
Much of the  Gulf coastline of Texas is paralleled by the Texas barrier islands, many of which enclose a series of estuaries where the state's rivers mix with water from the Gulf of Mexico. These water bodies include some of the largest and most ecologically productive coastal estuaries in the United States and contribute significantly to the ecological and economic resources of Texas.

Coastal Plains

The Gulf Coastal Plains extends from the Gulf of Mexico inland to the Balcones Fault and the Eastern Cross Timbers. This large area stretches from the cities of Paris to San Antonio to Del Rio but shows a large variety in vegetation. Windblown sands and dunes, grasslands, oak mottes and salt marshes make up the seaward areas. National Parks include Big Thicket National Preserve, Padre Island National Seashore and the Palo Alto Battlefield National Historic Site.

North Central Plains

The North Central Plains are bounded by the Caprock Escarpment to the west, the Edwards Plateau to the south, and the Eastern Cross Timbers to the east. This area includes the North Central Plains around the cities of Abilene and Wichita Falls, the Western Cross Timbers to the west of Fort Worth, the Grand Prairie, and the Eastern Cross Timbers to the east of Dallas. With about  annual rainfall, gently rolling to hilly forested land is part of a larger pine-hardwood forest of oaks, hickories, elm and gum trees. Soils vary from coarse sands to tight clays or shet rock clays and shales.

Great Plains

The Great Plains include the Llano Estacado, the Panhandle, Edwards Plateau, Toyah Basin, and the Llano Uplift. It is bordered on the east by the Caprock Escarpment in the panhandle and by the Balcones Fault to the southeast. Cities in this region include Midland and Odessa, Lubbock, and Amarillo. The Hill Country is a popular name for the area of hills along the Balcones Escarpment and is a transitional area between the Great Plains and the Gulf Coastal Plains. With about  annual rainfall, the southern end of the Great Plains are gently rolling plains of shrub and grassland, and home to the dramatic Caprock Canyons and Palo Duro Canyon state parks. The largest concentration of playa lakes in the world (nearly 22,000) is on the Southern High Plains of Texas and Eastern New Mexico.

Texas's blackland prairies were some of the first areas farmed in Texas. Highly expansive clays with characteristic dark coloration, called the Houston Black series, occur on about 1.5 million acres (6,000 km2) extending from north of Dallas south to San Antonio. The Professional Soil Scientists Association of Texas has recommended to the State Legislature that the Houston Black series be designated the State soil. The series was established in 1902. National Parks in this area are the Lyndon B. Johnson National Historical Park and the San Antonio Missions National Historical Park.

Mountains and basins

The Trans-Pecos Natural Region has less than  annual rainfall. The most complex Natural Region, it includes Sand Hills, the Stockton Plateau, desert valleys, wooded mountain slopes and desert grasslands. The Basin and Range Province is in West Texas, west of the Pecos River, beginning with the Davis Mountains on the east and the Rio Grande to its west and south. This region includes sand hills, desert valleys, wooded mountain slopes and desert grasslands. The vegetation diversity includes at least 268 grass species and 447 species of woody plants. National Parks include the Amistad National Recreation Area, Big Bend National Park, Chamizal National Memorial, Fort Davis National Historic Site, Guadalupe Mountains National Park, and the Rio Grande Wild and Scenic River. This area is part of the Chihuahuan Desert.

Climate

Continental, Mountain, and Modified Marine are the three major climatic types of Texas, with no distinguishable boundaries. Modified Marine, or subtropical, dominates the majority of the state.

Geology

Texas is mostly sedimentary rocks, with East Texas underlain by a Cretaceous and younger sequence of sediments, the trace of ancient shorelines east and south until the active continental margin of the Gulf of Mexico is met. This sequence is built atop the subsided crest of the Appalachian Mountains–Ouachita Mountains–Marathon Mountains zone of Pennsylvanian continental collision, which collapsed when rifting in Jurassic time opened the Gulf of Mexico. West from this orogenic crest, which is buried beneath the Dallas–Waco–Austin–San Antonio trend, the sediments are Permian and Triassic in age. Oil is found in the Cretaceous sediments in the east, the Permian sediments in the west, and along the Gulf coast and out on the Texas continental shelf. A few exposures of Precambrian igneous and metamorphic rocks are found in the central and western parts of the state, and Oligocene volcanic rocks are found in far west Texas, in the Big Bend area. A blanket of Miocene sediments known as the Ogallala formation in the western high plains region is an important aquifer. Texas has no active or dormant volcanoes and few earthquakes, being situated far from an active plate tectonic boundary. The Big Bend area is the most seismically active; however, the area is sparsely populated and suffers minimal damages and injuries, and no known fatalities have been attributed to a Texas earthquake.

Resources
With a large supply of natural resources, Texas is a major agricultural and industrial state, producing oil, cattle, sheep, and cotton. The state also produces poultry, eggs, dairy products, greenhouse and nursery products, wheat, hay, rice, sugar cane, and peanuts, and a range of fruits and vegetables.
Asphalt-bearing rocks, mainly cretaceous limestones, occur in Bexar, Burnet, Kinney, Uvalde, and other counties.
Cement is produced in Bexar, Comal, Dallas, Ector, Ellis, El Paso, Harris, Hays, McLennan, Nolan, Nueces, Potter, and Tarrant counties. Historically, Texas' Portland cement output accounts for about 10% of the annual United States production.
With an abundance of various types of clays, Texas is one of the leading producers of clays.
Bituminous coal occurs primarily in Coleman, Eastland, Erath, Jack, McCulloch, Montague, Palo Pinto, Parker, Throckmorton, Wise, and Young counties of Texas. Lignite, or brown coal, occurs in deposits in the Texas Coastal Plain.
Fluorspar or fluorite is an important industrial mineral used in the manufacture of steel, aluminum, glass, and fluorocarbons. It occurs at several localities in the Trans-Pecos and Llano regions of Texas.
Collecting gemstone rock and mineral specimens has proved quite profitable. Agate, jasper, cinnabar, fluorite, topaz, calcite, opal, petrified wood, and tektites are all commonly collected.
Deposits of graphite occur in the Llano region and was previously produced in Burnet County.
Bat guano occurs in numerous caverns in the Edwards Plateau and in the Trans-Pecos region and to a more limited extent in Central Texas.
Gypsum is extensively developed in Texas where the main occurrences are in the Permian Basin, the Cretaceous Edwards Formation in Gillespie and Menard counties, and the Gulf Coast salt domes of Harris County and previously Brooks County.
Texas is the leading producer of helium solely from the Cliffside gas field near Amarillo.
Deposits of iron ore are present in northeastern Texas as well as several in Central Texas.
Elements of the Lanthanide series are commonly termed rare-earth elements. Several of the rare earths have anomalous concentrations in the rhyolitic and related igneous rocks in the Trans-Pecos area of Texas. A deposit containing several rare-earth minerals was exposed at Barringer Hill in Llano County before it was covered by the waters of Lake Buchanan.
Limestones, abundant in many parts of Texas, are used in the manufacture of lime. Plants for the production of lime are operating in Bexar, Bosque, Burnet, Comal, Deaf Smith, Hill, Johnson, Nueces, and Travis counties.
Magnesium chloride, magnesium sulfate and other mineral salts are present in the Upper Permian Basin and in the underlying playas of the High Plains.
Manganese is known to occur in Precambrian rocks in Mason and Llano counties, in Val Verde County, in Jeff Davis County, and in Dickens County.
Mica is present in Precambrian pegmatite in the Llano region.
Common opal occurs on the Texas Coastal Plain.
Salts occurs in large quantities in salt domes in the Texas Coastal Plain and with other evaporites in the Permian Basin of West Texas, as well as near Grand Saline, Texas.
Sands used for industrial purposes commonly have been found in the Texas Coastal Plains, East Texas, north central Texas, and Central Texas; and sand mines have opened in the Shinnery (dunes) ecosystem of northern West Texas and the eastern part of the West Wingtip.
The discovery of silver in Texas has been credited by some to Franciscans who discovered and operated mines near El Paso about 1680. Documented silver production started in the late 1880s at the Presidio Mine, in Presidio County. Texas produced 32,663,405 troy ounces of silver between 1885 and 1955.
Sulfur occurs in the caprocks of salt domes in the Gulf Coastal Plain, in Permian-age bedded deposits in Trans-Pecos Texas.
In the past, uranium was produced from surface mines in Atascosa, Gonzales, Karnes, and Live Oak counties. All uranium mines are closed and Texas is no longer a producer.
The Barnett Shale, located in the Fort Worth basin, has gained attention in recent years as a source of natural gas. Controversy regarding drilling and exploration rights is an issue.

Regions 
There are several different methods used to describe the geographic and geological differences within the state, and there are often subdivisions within a region which more accurately describe both the terrain and the culture. Because there is no single standard for subdividing the regions of Texas, many accepted areas either overlap or seem to contradict others.  All are included for completeness.

 Big Bend
 Blackland Prairies
 Brazos Valley
 Canadian River Valley
 Central Texas
 Concho Valley
 Coastal Bend
 Cross Timbers
 East Texas
 Edwards Plateau
 Gulf Coast (of the US)
 Llano Estacado
 North Texas
 Northeast Texas
 Permian Basin
 Piney Woods
 Red River Valley
 Rio Grande Valley
 South Plains  The vernacular term 'South Plains' is part of Llano Estacado, listed above.
 South Texas
 Southeast Texas
 Texas Hill Country
 Texas Panhandle
 Texas Urban Triangle
 Trans-Pecos
 West Texas

Geographical regions that extend into Texas 

 Southwestern United States
 Southern United States
 Deep South
 Black Belt
 Great Plains
 Chihuahuan Desert
 High Plains
 Piney Woods

See also 

 List of rivers of Texas
 List of lakes in Texas
 List of regions of the United States
 List of ecoregions in the United States (EPA)

References

External links

The State of Texas website
Annual precipitation map
Texas A&M brief, The Climate of Texas
TNRIS — the Texas Natural Resources Information System
Big Bend National Park in context of earth's history
Rio Grande WebCam